Ulmus alata, the winged elm or wahoo, is a small- to medium-sized deciduous tree endemic to the woodlands of the southeastern and south-central United States. The species is tolerant of a wide range of soils, and of ponding, but is the least shade-tolerant of the North American elms. The tree is occasionally considered a nuisance as it readily invades old fields, forest clearings, and rangelands, proving particularly difficult to eradicate with herbicides.

Description 
As its common and scientific names imply, winged elm is most easily recognized by the very broad, thin pair of corky wings that form along the branchlets after a couple of years. The crown can be either rounded or pyramidal; the branches are pendulous. The leaves turn bright yellow in Autumn. The wind-pollinated perfect apetalous flowers are borne on long pedicels in March and April before the leaves appear.

Pests and diseases 
Like the other North American species of elm, U. alata is very susceptible to Dutch elm disease and Elm Yellows (Elm phloem necrosis).

Cultivation 
Ulmus alata is rarely cultivated beyond its natural range.  It remains in commercial production in the US, and is occasionally available in Europe. At the beginning of the 19th century, the tree was one of the three American elm species cultivated in ornamental plantations in Britain, but is now rare there.  Several specimens are grown in New Zealand.

Notable trees 
On the silty uplands of the Mississippi Delta, Ulmus alata can attain 27 m (89 ft) in height, although the trunk diameter rarely exceeds 60 cm (24 in) d.b.h.

Cultivars 
Lace Parasol

Other uses 
Ulmus alata is of minimal commercial significance, its hard timber considered no more remarkable than that of other American elms, and of limited use because of the commonly small size of the trees. However, owing to its resistance to splitting, it is used to make high-quality hockey sticks.

Accessions 
North America
Arnold Arboretum, US. Acc. no. 404-95, wild collected.
Bartlett Tree Experts, US. Acc. no. 1438, unrecorded provenance.
Brooklyn Botanic Garden, New York City, US. Acc. nos. 730275, X00886
Bernheim Arboretum and Research Forest , Clermont, Kentucky, US. No details available.
Morton Arboretum, US. Acc. no. 116-96, wild collected Papoose Lake, Illinois.
Europe
Brighton & Hove City Council, UK. NCCPG Elm Collection.
Grange Farm Arboretum, Lincolnshire, UK. Acc. no. 506
Royal Botanic Garden Edinburgh, UK. Acc. no. 20080092, from seed wild collected in USA.
Thenford House, Northamptonshire, UK. No details available.
Australasia
Manukau Cemetery & Crematorium, Auckland, New Zealand. No details available.

Nurseries 
North America
Widely available.
Europe
Arboretum Waasland, Nieuwkerken-Waas, Belgium.
Grange Farm Plants, Spalding, Lincolnshire, UK.
Plantentuin Esveld, Netherlands.

Seed suppliers 
Sheffield's Seeds Co. Inc., New York, US.

References

External links

Trees of the United States
Plants used in bonsai
Ulmus articles with images
alata